Julie Ann Strain (February 18, 1962 – January 10, 2021) was an American actress and model. She was chosen by Penthouse as Pet of the Month in June 1991 and Pet of the Year in 1993. Her biggest mainstream acting role was Julie, the protagonist in Heavy Metal 2000.

Early life
Strain was born in Concord, California. A graduate of Diablo Valley College, she had an extensive athletic background. She later moved to Las Vegas and later Hollywood, California.

Career
Julie Strain was Penthouse Pet of the Month for June 1991 and Penthouse Pet of the Year for 1993.

With over 100 films to her credit, Strain was nicknamed the "Queen of B-movies". She modelled for many comic book artists, including Simon Bisley, Milo Manara, and Kevin Eastman, whom she would later marry. Her likeness was also used in animation. She provided the voice for the main character in the animated film Heavy Metal 2000, and was the basis for the third-person shooter video game Heavy Metal: F.A.K.K. 2. She was a frequent guest panelist at comic book conventions like the San Diego Comic-Con.

In 1997, Heavy Metal published Strain's autobiography, Six Foot One and Worth the Climb. It was heavily illustrated with stills from her film and modeling career, plus paintings by Boris Vallejo, Julie Bell and Olivia De Berardinis.

Personal life and death
She was married to Teenage Mutant Ninja Turtles co-creator Kevin Eastman from 1995 to 2006. He co-starred in several of her films such as Day of the Warrior and L.E.T.H.A.L. Ladies: Return to Savage Beach.

Much of her youth was wiped from her memory by retrograde amnesia, due to a head injury after a fall from a horse in her 20s. In November 2018, her boyfriend Dave Gram announced that she was in the late stages of dementia, believed to be a result of her fall, and was receiving hospice care at home.

In January 2020, Malibu Bay Films, a studio which Strain worked with frequently, incorrectly reported that she had died, but then quickly retracted their statement after its error was established. One year later, Strain died on January 10, 2021, at age 58.

Partial filmography

References

External links

 
 
 
 

1962 births
2021 deaths
20th-century American actresses
21st-century American actresses
American female adult models
People from Concord, California
Place of death missing
American voice actresses
Deaths from dementia in California
Penthouse Pets of the Year
Actresses from the San Francisco Bay Area
American film actresses
Penthouse Pets